The AMC 30 Mesquite is a movie theater located in Mesquite, Texas, United States, at 19919 I-635.  It is in the AMC Theatres group. There is also a Fork and Screen dine in theaters with Cinema Suites and MacGuffin's bar and lounge in the theater.

References

Mesquite, Texas
Cinemas and movie theaters in Texas
AMC Theatres